Ubiquitin-conjugating enzyme E2 D1 is a protein that in humans is encoded by the UBE2D1 gene.

Function 

The modification of proteins with ubiquitin is an important cellular mechanism for targeting abnormal or short-lived proteins for degradation. Ubiquitination involves at least three classes of enzymes: ubiquitin-activating enzymes, or E1s, ubiquitin-conjugating enzymes, or E2s, and ubiquitin-protein ligases, or E3s. This gene encodes a member of the E2 ubiquitin-conjugating enzyme family. This enzyme is closely related to a stimulator of iron transport (SFT), and is up-regulated in hereditary hemochromatosis. It also functions in the ubiquitination of the tumor-suppressor protein p53 and the hypoxia-inducible transcription factor HIF1alpha by interacting with the E1 ubiquitin-activating enzyme and the E3 ubiquitin-protein ligases.

Interactions 

UBE2D1 has been shown to interact with:
 BARD1, 
 BRCA1, and
 UBE3A.

References

Further reading